Dobrodan Glacier is the 3.4 km long and 1.2 km wide glacier on the east side of Urda Ridge on Clarence Island in the South Shetland Islands, Antarctica situated south of Highton Glacier.  It drains the slopes of Mount Irving and Duclos-Guyot Bluff, flows northeastwards and enters the Southern Ocean south of Lebed Point.

The glacier is named after the settlement of Dobrodan in Northern Bulgaria.

Location
British mapping in 1972 and 2009.

See also
 List of glaciers in the Antarctic
 Glaciology

Maps
British Antarctic Territory. Scale 1:200000 topographic map. DOS 610 Series, Sheet W 61 54. Directorate of Overseas Surveys, Tolworth, UK, 1972.
South Shetland Islands: Elephant, Clarence and Gibbs Islands. Scale 1:220000 topographic map. UK Antarctic Place-names Committee, 2009.
 Antarctic Digital Database (ADD). Scale 1:250000 topographic map of Antarctica. Scientific Committee on Antarctic Research (SCAR), 1993–2016.

References
 Bulgarian Antarctic Gazetteer. Antarctic Place-names Commission. (details in Bulgarian, basic data in English)
 Dobrodan Glacier SCAR Composite Gazetteer of Antarctica

External links
 Dobrodan Glacier. Copernix satellite image

Glaciers of Clarence Island (South Shetland Islands)
Bulgaria and the Antarctic